Agusan del Norte, officially the Province of Agusan del Norte (Butuanon: Probinsya hong Agusan del Norte), is a province in the Caraga region of the Philippines. Its capital is the city of Cabadbaran with several government offices located in the city of Butuan. It is bordered on the northwest by Butuan Bay; northeast by Surigao del Norte; mid-east by Surigao del Sur; southeast by Agusan del Sur, and southwest by Misamis Oriental.

History

Spanish and American era

Prior to its creation as an independent province, Agusan, as it was once undivided, was under the jurisdiction of Surigao province during the Spanish colonial period. In 1907, Agusan was separated from Surigao by the American government, creating the Agusan province.

World War II
During World War II in 1942, the Japanese Imperial forces landed in Northern Agusan.

In 1945, Filipino soldiers of the 6th, 10th, 101st, 102nd, 103rd, 107th and 110th Infantry Division of the Philippine Commonwealth Army and the 10th Infantry Regiment of the Philippine Constabulary together with the recognized Agusan guerrilla fighter units against the Japanese forces beginning the liberation in Northern Agusan during World War II.

During the war, a unit of the joint Philippine-American defense force were located at Manot, Talacogon, in the interior of the Agusan Valley.

Independence
In 1967, Republic Act 4979 divided Agusan into two independent provinces: Agusan del Norte and Agusan del Sur.

On August 16, 2000, the seat of provincial government was transferred from Butuan to Cabadbaran through Republic Act 8811, although the province is yet to complete the transfer of provincial services and functions to the new capital.

Geography

Agusan del Norte is situated in Mindanao's western section of Caraga. It is bordered on the northwest by the Butuan Bay; northeast by Surigao del Norte; mid-east by Surigao del Sur; southeast by Agusan del Sur, and southwest by Misamis Oriental.

The central portion of the province forms the lower basin of the third longest river in the country, the Agusan, its mouth located at the Butuan Bay. Consequently, the terrain surrounding the river features flat to rolling lands. Mountainous terrain dominate the northeastern and western areas.

The country's fourth largest lake, Lake Mainit is situated at the northern border between the province of Surigao del Norte.

Administrative divisions
Agusan del Norte comprises 10 municipalities and 1 component city. There are 253 barangays (including the independent city of Butuan).

The city of Cabadbaran is the officially designated capital of the province per Republic Act 8811. The highly urbanized city of Butuan is geographically within but administratively independent from the province.

Demographics

The population of Agusan del Norte in the 2020 census was 387,503 people, making it the country's 64th most populous province.

Religion
In 2013, the Diocese of Butuan (Catholic-Hierarchy) reported that Roman Catholicism is the predominant religion of the province comprising roughly 71% of the population and significant minority belongs to Iglesia Filipina Independiente with 10% . The remaining beliefs usually belong to other Christian denominations as well as Islam.

Economy

The economy of the province is dominantly agricultural, major crops of which include rice, corn, coconut, abaca, banana and mango.

Government

Agusan del Norte has two congressional districts encompassing its 10 municipalities and 1 component city, as well as the highly urbanized city of Butuan.

Tourism 

The province has many beaches in Cabadbaran and the municipalities of Carmen, Buenavista, and Nasipit. Mount Hilong-Hilong, one of the tallest in the province, is located in Cabadbaran.

From the top of Prayer Mountain (Mount Pongkay), visitors can have a panoramic view of Cabadbaran which includes buildings, churches, rivers and the sea. The Agusan River, the longest in Mindanao and the third longest in the Philippines is in Butuan. Looming southwest of the Agusan Valley is Mount Mayapay, a mountain plateau. The ancient Balangay boats were found in Butuan, excavated in the Balangay Shrine across the Masao River from Bood Promontory. They played a major role because of Butuan being a port city. Since its discovery, the Balangays have become an icon of Butuan. The Kaya ng Pinoy, Inc. recreated the Balangay boats and have sailed it as part of their project, the Balangay Voyage.

References

External links

 
 
 Official website of the Provincial Government of Agusan del Norte

 
Provinces of the Philippines
Provinces of Caraga
States and territories established in 1967
1967 establishments in the Philippines